Footpads is an 1895 British short  silent drama film, directed by Robert W. Paul, featuring a top-hatted pedestrian against a rainy London backdrop, who is assaulted by three footpads and rescued by a passing policeman. The "atmospheric" film, "is chiefly of interest for its imaginative approach to background décor," where according to Michael Brooke of BFI Screenonline, "some effort has been made towards establishing a sense of realism." Roland-François Lack of University College London points out that this painted backdrop looks like "a hybrid of Trafalgar Square, with its electric advertisement for Bovril, and Piccadilly Circus, with the advertisement for Mellin's Food", but has discovered that it in fact represents Ludgate Circus.

References

External links

1890s British films
British black-and-white films
British crime drama films
British silent short films
Films set in London
1890s crime drama films
1895 short films
Films directed by Robert W. Paul
Silent drama films